The callsign CHCT-TV may refer to these television stations that previously used the callsign:

 CICT-DT, Calgary, Alberta, Canada
 CHCO-TV, St. Andrews, New Brunswick, Canada